The 1943 Central Michigan Chippewas football team represented Central Michigan College of Education, later renamed Central Michigan University, as an independent during the 1943 college football season.  In their seventh season under head coach Ron Finch, the Chippewas compiled a 2–3 record, were shut out in all three losses, and were outscored by all opponents by a combined total of 69 to 20. The team was held to 20 points on offense in a pair of victories over Alma College (13–6 and 7–0). The three losses were to Western Michigan (0–19), Alma (0–8), and Bowling Green (0–36).

Schedule

References

Central Michigan
Central Michigan Chippewas football seasons
Central Michigan Chippewas football